Greetings from... Jake is the sixth studio album by American country music singer Jake Owen. It was released on March 29, 2019, through Big Loud Records. The album is produced by Joey Moi. It is Owen's first album with the label after leaving RCA Records Nashville in 2017. The album was preceded by the singles "I Was Jack (You Were Diane)" and "Down to the Honkytonk", both released in 2018.

Background
Owen wanted the theme of the record to be appreciation of his home state of Florida, as well as a "pure representation of who I am, where I've been, what I love and where I am going", calling it a "fresh hello from a point in my career where I feel so comfortable and fulfilled".

Promotion
Owen announced the title on his social media accounts in late February 2019 before posting the full cover art on March 1, which resembles a postcard depicting "everything Florida has to offer", including palm trees, oranges, and a sailboat. The cover art and title is similar to Bruce Springsteen’s 1973 debut album, Greetings from Asbury Park, N.J.

Commercial performance
The album debuted at No. 8 on Billboards Top Country Albums chart, selling 4,000 copies in the first week. It has sold 7,700 copies in the United States as of July 2019.

Track listing

Charts

Weekly charts

Year-end charts

Certifications

References

2019 albums
Jake Owen albums
Big Loud albums
Albums produced by Joey Moi